Gottfried Wilhelm Leibniz's theory of pre-established harmony is a philosophical theory about causation under which every "substance" affects only itself, but all the substances (both bodies and minds) in the world nevertheless seem to causally interact with each other because they have been programmed by God in advance to "harmonize" with each other. Leibniz's term for these substances was "monads", which he described in a popular work (Monadology §7) as "windowless".

Overview
Leibniz's theory is best known as a solution to the mind–body problem of how mind can interact with the body. Leibniz rejected the idea of physical bodies affecting each other, and explained all physical causation in this way. 

Under pre-established harmony, the preprogramming of each mind must be extremely complex, since only it causes its own thoughts or actions, for as long as it exists. To appear to interact, each substance's "program" must contain a description of either the entire universe, or of how the object behaves at all times during all interactions that appear to occur.

An example:

An apple falls on Alice's head, apparently causing the experience of pain in her mind. In fact, the apple does not cause the pain—the pain is caused by some previous state of Alice's mind. If Alice then seems to shake her hand in anger, it is not actually her mind that causes this, but some previous state of her hand.

Note that if a mind behaves as a windowless monad, there is no need for any other object to exist to create that mind's sense perceptions, leading to a solipsistic universe that consists only of that mind. Leibniz seems to admit this in his Discourse on Metaphysics, section 14. However, he claims that his principle of harmony, according to which God creates the best and most harmonious world possible, dictates that the perceptions (internal states) of each monad "expresses" the world in its entirety, and the world expressed by the monad actually exists. Although Leibniz says that each monad is "windowless," he also claims that it functions as a "mirror" of the entire created universe.

On occasion, Leibniz styled himself as "the author of the system of preestablished harmony".

Immanuel Kant's professor Martin Knutzen regarded pre-established harmony as "the pillow for the lazy mind".

In the sixth of his Metaphysical Meditation, Descartes talked about a "coordinated disposition of created things set up by God", shortly after having identified "nature in its general aspect" with God himself. His conception of the relationship between God and his normative nature actualized in the existing world recalls both the pre-established harmony of Leibniz and the Deus sive Natura of Baruch Spinoza.

See also 

 Best of all possible worlds
 Determinism/hard determinism
 Noumenon
 Occasionalism
 Phenomenon
 Psychophysical parallelism
 Superdeterminism

References

External links
 Leibniz's Philosophy of Mind from the Stanford Encyclopedia of Philosophy

Arguments in philosophy of mind
Gottfried Wilhelm Leibniz